

cl
Cl-719

cla
cladribine (INN)
Claforan (Sanofi-Aventis), also known as cefotaxime
clamidoxic acid (INN)
Clamohexal (Hexal Australia) [Au].
clamoxyquine (INN)
clanfenur (INN)
clanobutin (INN)
clantifen (INN)
Claravis (Barr Pharmaceuticals)
Clarinex
Claripel
clarithromycin (INN)
Claritin (Schering-Plough)
clavulanic acid (INN)
Clavulin (GlaxoSmithKline)
clazolam (INN)
clazolimine (INN)
clazuril (INN)

cle
Clear Away Disc
Clear By Design Gel
Clear Eyes ACR
Clear Tussin 30
Clearsil Maximum Strength
clebopride (INN)
clefamide (INN)
clemastine (INN)
clemeprol (INN)
clemizole penicillin (INN)
clemizole (INN)
clenbuterol (INN)
Clenia
clenoliximab (INN)
clenpirin (INN)
clentiazem (INN)
Cleocin
cletoquine (INN)
clevidipine (INN, USAN)
Cleviprex (The Medicines Company) redirects to clevidipine
clevudine (INN)

cli

clib-clin
clibucaine (INN)
clidafidine (INN)
clidanac (INN)
clidinium bromide (INN)
Climacteron
Climara pro
Climara
climazolam (INN)
climbazole (INN)
climiqualine (INN)
clinafloxacin (INN)
Clinda-derm
Clindagel
Clindamax
clindamycin (INN)
Clindets
Clindex
Clindoxyl Gel
Clinimix E
Clinimix
Clinisol
clinofibrate (INN)
clinolamide (INN)
Clinoril
clinprost (INN)

clio-clis
clioquinol (INN)
clioxanide (INN)
cliprofen (INN)
cliropamine (INN)
Clistin

clo

clob-cloc
clobazam (INN)
clobenoside (INN)
clobenzepam (INN)
clobenzorex (INN)
clobenztropine (INN)
clobetasol (INN)
clobetasone (INN)
Clobex
clobutinol (INN)
clobuzarit (INN)
clocanfamide (INN)
clocapramine (INN)
clociguanil (INN)
clocinizine (INN)
Clocort Maximum Strength
clocortolone (INN)
clocoumarol (INN)

clod
clodacaine (INN)
clodanolene (INN)
clodantoin (INN)
clodazon (INN)
Cloderm
clodoxopone (INN)
clodronate disodium (USAN)
clodronic acid (INN)

clof-clog
clofarabine (USAN)
clofazimine (INN)
clofedanol (INN)
clofenamic acid (INN)
clofenamide (INN)
clofenciclan (INN)
clofenetamine (INN)
clofenotane (INN)
clofenoxyde (INN)
clofenvinfos (INN)
clofeverine (INN)
clofexamide (INN)
clofezone (INN)
clofibrate (INN)
clofibric acid (INN)
clofibride (INN)
clofilium phosphate (INN)
clofluperol (INN)
clofoctol (INN)
cloforex (INN)
clofurac (INN)
clogestone (INN)
cloguanamil (INN)

clom-clon
clomacran (INN)
clomegestone (INN)
clometacin (INN)
clometerone (INN)
clomethiazole (INN)
clometocillin (INN)
Clomhexal (Hexal Australia) [Au], also known as clomifene
Clomid
clomifene (INN)
clomifenoxide (INN)
clominorex (INN)
clomipramine (INN)
clomocycline (INN)
clomoxir (INN)
Clonapan
clonazepam (INN)
clonazoline (INN)
clonidine (INN)
clonitazene (INN)
clonitrate (INN)
clonixeril (INN)
clonixin (INN)

clop-cloq
clopamide (INN)
clopenthixol (INN)
cloperastine (INN)
cloperidone (INN)
clopidogrel (INN)
clopidol (INN)
clopimozide (INN)
clopipazan (INN)
clopirac (INN)
Clopixol
cloponone (INN)
Clopra
cloprednol (INN)
cloprostenol (INN)
cloprothiazole (INN)
cloquinate (INN)
cloquinozine (INN)

clor
cloracetadol (INN)
cloral betaine (INN)
cloramfenicol pantotenate complex (INN)
cloranolol (INN)
clorazepate (INN)
cloretate (INN)
clorexolone (INN)
clorgiline (INN)
cloricromen (INN)
cloridarol (INN)
clorindanic acid (INN)
clorindanol (INN)
clorindione (INN)
clormecaine (INN)
clorofene (INN)
cloroperone (INN)
cloroqualone (INN)
clorotepine (INN)
Clorpactin WCS-90
Clorpactin XCB Powder
clorprenaline (INN)
Clorpres
clorsulon (INN)
clortermine (INN)

clos-cloz
closantel (INN)
closiramine (INN)
clostebol (INN)
clotiapine (INN)
clotiazepam (INN)
cloticasone (INN)
clotioxone (INN)
clotixamide (INN)
Clotrimaderm
clotrimazole (INN)
clovoxamine (INN)
cloxacepride (INN)
cloxacillin (INN)
Cloxapen
cloxazolam (INN)
cloxestradiol (INN)
cloximate (INN)
cloxiquine (INN)
cloxotestosterone (INN)
cloxypendyl (INN)
clozapine (INN)
Clozaril

cly
Clysodrast